Lamar Jeffers (April 16, 1888 – June 1, 1983) was a U.S. Representative from Alabama.

Born in Anniston, Alabama, Jeffers attended public schools and Alabama Presbyterian College at Anniston.

He served with the Alabama National Guard from 1904 to 1914. He served as clerk of the circuit court of Calhoun County, taking office in January 1917. Jeffers resigned that office in May 1917 and entered the U.S. Army, serving with the Eighty-second Division in France.
He was awarded the Distinguished Service Cross by the United States Government.
He was promoted to rank of major of infantry.

Jeffers was elected as a Democrat to the Sixty-seventh Congress to fill the vacancy caused by the death of Fred L. Blackmon.
He was reelected to the Sixty-eighth and to the five succeeding Congresses and served from June 7, 1921, to January 3, 1935.
He served as chairman of the Committee on Civil Service (Seventy-second and Seventy-third Congresses).
He was an unsuccessful candidate for renomination in 1934.
Resided in Daytona Beach, Florida, until his death there on June 1, 1983.
He was interred at Arlington National Cemetery.

References

1888 births
1983 deaths
United States Army officers
Burials at Arlington National Cemetery
Politicians from Anniston, Alabama
People from Daytona Beach, Florida
Democratic Party members of the United States House of Representatives from Alabama
20th-century American politicians